Make It Be is the first collaborative studio album by American musicians R. Stevie Moore and Jason Falkner, self-released on January 10, 2015. The album was recorded in November 2012. On March 10, 2017, it was reissued through Bar/None Records and was met with generally favorable reviews.

The album consists of newly written material along with rerecordings of a few of Moore's songs. Its reissue added one more track, "Horror Show", written by Falkner.

Critical reception

At Metacritic, which assigns a normalized rating out of 100 to reviews from critics, Make It Be received an average score of 79 based on 10 reviews, indicating "generally favorable reviews". The Guardians Gwilym Mumford wrote, "A certain tolerance for Moore’s loopier sound experiments and slam poetry skits may be required here, but for the most part this is an appealing mix of strangeness and sheen."  Tim Sendra of AllMusic reviewed that the "record is packed with really fun, great-sounding songs and moments where the guys sound like they're having a blast working together. PopMatters Jeff Beaudoin deemed the album "a fine, fine record that deserves to be heard now and well into the distant future."

Track listing

References

External links
 
 

R. Stevie Moore albums
Jason Falkner albums
Collaborative albums
2015 albums